Electric Park may refer to:

Any of several Electric Park amusement parks that existed in the early Twentieth Century
Electric Park, fictional town in motion picture Dear Wendy
Electric Park, neighborhood in Lincoln Park, Michigan
Electric Park, original name of Italian amusement ride manufacturer IE Park 
Electric Park Brake, subsidiary of TRW Automotive

See also
Tucson Electric Park
Wind farm, sometimes called "wind electric park" or "wind park"